Aurorite is a dark-colored mineral with the chemical formula (Mn,Ag,Ca)MnO·3HO. It is named for its type locality, the North Aurora mine in White Pine County, Nevada.

References

External links 

 Aurorite data sheet
 Aurorite on the Handbook of Mineralogy

Manganese(II,IV) minerals
Silver minerals
Calcium minerals
Hydrates